Ariela Meizan  is a former Israeli paralympic swimmer and wheelchair basketball player. She won seven Paralympic medals, three individual medals in swimming and four medals as a member of the women's wheelchair basketball team.

At the 1972 Summer Paralympics, she won a bronze medal as a member of the women's team in wheelchair basketball. She took part in various tournaments in swimming and athletics, reaching fourth to eighth place in numerous competitions and failing to reach the final round in two others. 

At the 1976 Summer Paralympics, she won four gold medals: one as a member of the women's basketball team and three individual medals in swimming.

Meizan was a member of Israel's women's wheelchair basketball team to three more Paralympic Games, winning silver medals at the 1980 Summer Paralympics and at the 1984 Summer Paralympics and making her final appearance at the 1988 Summer Paralympics.

Among her achievements at the IWAS World Games, at the 1970 Stoke Mandeville Games Meizan won three gold medals in swimming and in wheelchair fencing as well as other achievements, including a bronze medal in swimming. At the 1971 Stoke Mandeville Games she gained a gold medals in the 75m freestyle swimming tournament and as a member of the women's wheelchair fencing team. She won several gold medals in swimming at the 1978 Stoke Mandeville Games.

References

External links
 

Living people
Israeli female swimmers
Israeli women's wheelchair basketball players
Paralympic wheelchair basketball players of Israel
Paralympic swimmers of Israel
Paralympic athletes of Israel
Wheelchair basketball players at the 1972 Summer Paralympics
Wheelchair basketball players at the 1976 Summer Paralympics
Wheelchair basketball players at the 1980 Summer Paralympics
Wheelchair basketball players at the 1984 Summer Paralympics
Wheelchair basketball players at the 1988 Summer Paralympics
Swimmers at the 1972 Summer Paralympics
Swimmers at the 1976 Summer Paralympics
Athletes (track and field) at the 1972 Summer Paralympics
Medalists at the 1972 Summer Paralympics
Medalists at the 1976 Summer Paralympics
Medalists at the 1980 Summer Paralympics
Medalists at the 1984 Summer Paralympics
Paralympic gold medalists for Israel
Paralympic silver medalists for Israel
Paralympic bronze medalists for Israel